Albert Kirby Fairfax, 12th Lord Fairfax of Cameron (23 June 1870 – 4 October 1939), was an American-born Scottish Representative Peer and politician in the British House of Lords.

Early life
Born at Northampton, in Largo, Prince George's County, Maryland, Fairfax was discovered to be the rightful holder of his title after it had been essentially forgotten by his family (which had resided in the United States for several generations). After researchers determined Albert Kirby Fairfax to be the 12th Lord Fairfax of Cameron, his title was allowed by the House of Lords in 1908. His father was John Fairfax, 11th Lord Fairfax of Cameron, and his mother was Mary Brown Kirby.

Career
He was a member of Fairfax & Company, of George Street, London. He was a partner of Bonbright & Company, George Street, London.

He was naturalized as a UK citizen on 17 November 1908. He was elected a Scottish Representative Peer and served in that capacity from 19 October 1917 to his death on 4 October 1939.

Personal life
Lord Fairfax of Cameron married Maude Wishart McKelvie, daughter of James McKelvie, in 1922.
They had two sons:
 Thomas Brian McElvie Fairfax, 13th Lord Fairfax of Cameron (14 May 1923 – 8 April 1964), who married Sonia Helen Gunston (b. 1926)
 Peregrine John Wishart Fairfax (8 March 1925 – 23 February 2012)
The 12th Lord Fairfax died in October 1939, aged 69, and was succeeded in the lordship by the elder of his two sons, Thomas.

References

Source

 Kidd, Charles, Williamson, David (editors). Debrett's Peerage and Baronetage (1990 edition). New York: St Martin's Press, 1990.
 

1870 births
1939 deaths
American emigrants to England
Episcopalians from Maryland
American people of English descent
American people of Scottish descent
Albert
People from Prince George's County, Maryland
Scottish people of English descent
Scottish representative peers
Naturalised citizens of the United Kingdom
Lords Fairfax of Cameron